Mr. High Heels is a 2016 Chinese romance comedy film directed by Lu Ke. It was released on February 14, 2016, in China by Le Vision Pictures.

Plot

Hang Yuan, a man who's been in love with a friend for a very long time, is willing to do anything to win her over. Even cross-dressing.
Otaku game designer Hang Yuan (played by Du Jiang), crushes on fellow student Li Ruo xin (played by Xue Kai Qi) from an early age, however, each time he decides to confess his love, Ruo Xin declares that she has entered a new romance. Since being betrayed by her ex fiancé, Ruoxin no longer believes in men and instead she gets closer and closer to Sammi ( played by Li Yuan). As a result, Hang Yuan is in despair At this juncture, his good friend from a wealthy family, Lin Sen Sen (Chen Xue deng) offers a solution to his problems. He proposed to Hang Yuan that he cross dresses in an attempt to approach Ruo xin in his bold pursuit of love. Accidentally, Hang Yuan gains instant internet fame and becomes an internet sensation. However, these good times do not last long and Ruo xin soon sees through his disguise.

Cast
Du Jiang
Fiona Sit
Yu Xintian
Cheney Chen
Wong Cho-lam
Huo Siyan
Li Yuan
Xiao Xiao
Li Yu

Reception
The film has grossed  in China.

References

Chinese romantic comedy films
Chinese LGBT-related films
Le Vision Pictures films
2016 romantic comedy films
LGBT-related romantic comedy films
2010s Mandarin-language films